Salute is a 1929 drama film directed by John Ford and starring George O'Brien, Helen Chandler, William Janney, Stepin Fetchit, Frank Albertson and Ward Bond. It is about the football rivalry of the Army–Navy Game, and two brothers, played by O'Brien and Janney, one of West Point, the other of Annapolis. John Wayne had an uncredited role in the film, as one of three midshipmen who perform a mild hazing.

The film was partly filmed on location at the Naval Academy in Annapolis, Maryland.

Plot

Cast 
 George O'Brien as Cadet John Randall
 Helen Chandler as Nancy Wayne
 William Janney as Midshipman Paul Randall
 Stepin Fetchit as Smoke Screen
 Frank Albertson as Midshipman Albert Edward Price
 Ward Bond as Midshipman  Harold
 John Wayne as (uncredited) Midshipman Bill
 Joyce Compton as Marian Wilson

See also
 John Wayne filmography

External links

BFI

1920s sports drama films
American black-and-white films
American football films
Films directed by John Ford
Fox Film films
Films directed by David Butler
American sports drama films
1929 drama films
1920s American films
1920s English-language films